Prugoc is a village in Pristina municipality.

Notes

References 

Villages in Pristina